Prozone Mall Coimbatore is one of the largest horizontally designed shopping malls in India, covering over . It was opened on 19 July 2017 at Sivanandapuram, Saravanampatti Road, Coimbatore. It has some attracting places like Inox fun unlimited, etc.

Facilities 
The mall has:

 Outlets from major clothing and apparel brands.
 09 screens INOX
 A food court 
 A CRA SPEEDWAY Go-kart track on the roof.

The mall is located near Saravanampatti, one of Coimbatore's faster-growing neighborhoods due to an influx of IT companies. The mall's large tenants include H&M and Spar stores.

History 
The mall was constructed by Prozone Intu Pvt. Ltd. and designed by Bentel Architects of South Africa. It is promoted by the UK-based Intu Properties Plc and Prozone.

References

Shopping malls in Coimbatore
Shopping malls established in 2017
2017 establishments in Tamil Nadu